Robert Oberrauch (born November 6, 1965) is a former Italian ice hockey player.  He represented Italy at the Olympic games in 1992, 1994 and 1998.

References

External links

1965 births
Living people
Bolzano HC players
Ice hockey players at the 1992 Winter Olympics
Ice hockey players at the 1994 Winter Olympics
Ice hockey players at the 1998 Winter Olympics
Italian ice hockey defencemen
Kamloops Blazers players
Moose Jaw Warriors players
Olympic ice hockey players of Italy
Ice hockey people from Bolzano
Seattle Thunderbirds players
Germanophone Italian people
Italian expatriate ice hockey people
Italian expatriate sportspeople in Canada
Italian expatriate sportspeople in the United States